The Party of the Cardenist Front of National Reconstruction (PFCRN) was a Mexican political party that arose during the 1989 elections, having evolved from the coffee cooperative .

References

Defunct political parties in Mexico
Socialist parties in Mexico